Jill Marie Jones (born January 4, 1975) is an American actress and former professional dancer and cheerleader. Jones is best known for her role as Antoinette "Toni" Childs-Garrett on the UPN comedy series, Girlfriends (2000–2006). Jones  has appeared in a number of films, and had the recurring role as Cynthia Irving on the Fox supernatural series, Sleepy Hollow. From 2015 to 2016, she starred as Amanda Fisher in the Starz horror-comedy series, Ash vs Evil Dead.

Early life
Jones was born in Dallas, Texas. After attending Duncanville High School, and Texas Woman's University, Jones was a Dallas Cowboys Cheerleader for two years, a Dallas Mavericks Dancer for one year, and toured with the United Service Organization (USO) and United States Department of Defense to Korea, Japan, Israel, and Egypt. She has also performed on "Monday Night Football" and "The Miss Texas Pageant." She started her career as model, before moving to Los Angeles to pursue acting full-time.

Career

Jones made her screen debut in 2000, on the Saturday morning series City Guys. Later that year, she won the co-leading role alongside Tracee Ellis Ross, Golden Brooks and Persia White on the UPN comedy series, Girlfriends which was created by Mara Brock Akil. She played the role of self-centered and materialistic Toni Childs for six seasons of the series. In May 2006, it was confirmed that Jones left Girlfriends because her contract ended. When asked in a 2007 interview whether she felt the character of Toni Childs had run its course, Jones responded: "No, I think if Toni came back and when I say no, I say it because there are brilliant writers on ‘Girlfriends’. There is so much more that you can do. For me and my career, my contract was up after six seasons and there's a whole film world that I wanted to experience and that's what I’ve been doing. I think if Toni came back to the show, there would be so much more to write and much more to bring. That's a testament to how great Mara and the rest of the writers are".

After leaving Girlfriends, Jones began starring in films. She had the female leading roles in comedy films Universal Remote and Redrum (both 2007), and appeared in The Perfect Holiday, opposite Queen Latifah and Terrence Howard as well as Morris Chestnut, Rachel True, and Gabrielle Union. In August 2007, Jones filmed Major Movie Star with Jessica Simpson. In September 2008, she appeared in the Ne-Yo video for "She Got Her Own" which is a remix to his hit single "Miss Independent". She next appeared in the 2010 music video "Got Your Back" starring T.I. ft. Keri Hilson. Jones also co-starred alongside Laura Harring in the 2009 independent film Drool.

In 2010, Jones had the leading role in the TBS micro-series, Gillian in Georgia. In 2013, she appeared on the second season of FX series, American Horror Story in the episode "Spilt Milk" as a call girl named Pandora. Later that year, Jones was cast in the recurring role as Cynthia Irving in the Fox supernatural drama series, Sleepy Hollow. In February 2015, Starz announced that Jones was cast in the leading role as Michigan State Trooper Amanda Fisher in the comedy horror series Ash vs Evil Dead. In 2018, Jones began starring and producing Urban Movie Channel drama series, Monogamy. In 2019, she reunites with her Girlfriends co-stars Tracee Ellis Ross, Golden Brooks and Persia White in an episode of ABC comedy series Black-ish.
 
In 2020, Jones was cast in the Oprah Winfrey Network legal drama series Delilah created by Craig Wright.

Filmography

Film

Television

References

External links
 
 

1975 births
American film actresses
Living people
National Basketball Association cheerleaders
American cheerleaders
National Football League cheerleaders
People from Duncanville, Texas
Duncanville High School alumni
African-American actresses
American television actresses
21st-century American actresses
Actresses from Dallas
Texas Woman's University alumni
21st-century African-American women
21st-century African-American people
20th-century African-American people
20th-century African-American women